Stephanie Courtney Watts (born April 12, 1997) is an American professional basketball player. She played briefly for the Chicago Sky of the Women's National Basketball Association (WNBA). She was drafted by the Los Angeles Sparks in the first round of the 2021 WNBA Draft and was traded to Chicago during the 2021 season.

High School career 

Watts is from Wesley Chapel, North Carolina and attended Weddington High School. She was named a McDonald's All-American and was North Carolina's Gatorade Player of the Year. She was a five-star recruit going into college and was ranked the No. 21 player overall in her recruiting class.

College career 

She started her college career at the University of North Carolina before transferring to the University of Southern California as a graduate. She returned to UNC as a sixth-year transfer to finish a graduate degree.

Wats was a three-year starter during her first stint at UNC, when she was named ACC Freshman of the Year. She was also named to the All-ACC second team that year. She also set a UNC freshman record for three pointers made. She crossed the 1,000 career points mark as a junior.

North Carolina and Southern California statistics

Source

Professional career 

Watts became the highest UNC player selected in the WNBA Draft since La'Tangela Atkinson in 2006. She is the 21st player from the program to be selected and the fourth Top Ten pick.

WNBA career statistics

Regular season

|-
| align="left" | 2021
| align="left" | Chicago
| 6 || 0 || 14.0 || .211 || .100 || .750 || 3.7 || 0.5 || 0.3 || 1.3 || 2.5
|-
| align="left" | Career
| align="left" | 1 year, 1 team
| 6 || 0 || 14.0 || .211 || .100 || .750 || 3.7 || 0.5 || 0.3 || 1.3 || 2.5

References

External links
North Carolina Tar Heels bio
USC Trojans bio

1997 births
Living people
American women's basketball players
Basketball players from New York City
Chicago Sky players
Los Angeles Sparks draft picks
McDonald's High School All-Americans
North Carolina Tar Heels women's basketball players
Point guards
Sportspeople from the Bronx
USC Trojans women's basketball players